The Honda VTR250 is a 90° V-twin motorcycle produced by Honda that has had one major revision. The original VTR250 was a faired sport bike sold only in the United States and Canada from 1988 to 1990. The next VTR250 model is a naked bike, produced from 1997 to 2018, available only in the Asia-Pacific region, and for 2009, Europe.

1988–1990 

The Honda Interceptor VTR250 was sold only in the United States from 1988 to 1990, with moderate changes occurring over the three model years. With a  four-stroke liquid-cooled DOHC V-twin engine and a six-speed transmission, VTR250 was the smallest of Honda's Interceptor line of motorcycles.

The 1990 model had a 17-inch front wheel and the front disc brakes were external.

1997–2018 

Introduced in 1997, the newer VTR250 has been compared to the Ducati Monster in appearance, with a trellis frame, V-twin engine, and initially a similar instrument layout, with no tachometer. The transmission was changed from six-speeds to five. The 2009 model VTR250 saw the first major design changes since the instrument panel update in 2003, which added a tachometer. With a redesigned rear end and midsection, the 2009 model also has electronic fuel injection.

The VTR250 is widely sold in the Asia Pacific region but not in the US. While currently difficult to obtain in European countries, the 2009 model VTR250 will be imported to Europe. It was officially imported into Australia between 1998 and 2007, with the 2009 model being reintroduced mid-2009.

Specifications 
All specifications are manufacturer claimed as per specific model owners manuals and workshop service manuals, except as stated.

References 

VTR250
Standard motorcycles
Sport bikes
Motorcycles introduced in 1988